Pawno is a 2016 Australian romantic comedy drama film set in the diverse and multicultural Melbourne suburb of Footscray. It was released in cinemas around Australia on 21 April 2016 by Mind Blowing World.

The film was directed by Paul Ireland from a script by Damian Hill. The two co-produced their debut feature film through their production company, Toothless Pictures. It stars John Brumpton, Kerry Armstrong, Maeve Dermody, Damian Hill, Mark Coles Smith and Malcolm Kennard.

The film premiered to critical success, and was the fastest-selling Australian film at the Melbourne International Film Festival 2015, finishing in the top 10 for the MIFF Audience Award. Film critic David Stratton, formerly of At the Movies, gave Pawno four stars in The Australian.

Plot synopsis
Pawno is set in the multicultural suburb of Footscray, Victoria. A character-driven story, Pawno examines the intersecting lives of 14 local characters and their resident pawnbroker.

Cast
 John Brumpton as Les Underwood
 Maeve Dermody as Kate
 Damian Hill as Danny Williams
 Malcolm Kennard as Carlo
 Mark Coles Smith as Pauly
 Kerry Armstrong as Jennifer Montgomery
 Tony Rickards as Harry
 Daniel Frederiksen as Paige Turner
  Brad McMurray as Jason Spears

Production
The film was independently funded through a crowd-funding campaign, and was shortlisted for the $100,000 CinefestOz Film Prize.

Reception
Pawno holds a 75% approval rating on Rotten Tomatoes.

Russell Marks in The Monthly gave the film a scathing review. "Australian cinema regularly produces better, funnier, more perceptive content than Pawno. The film's real quality is in its capacity to market both its multiculturalism and its localism, while reflecting a nostalgia among its audience for a mythic monoculture. Only about half the audience at the screening I was at were laughing, and a couple walked out partway through. I wanted to, but I also wanted to write about it."

Accolades

External links
 Pawno on Internet Movie Database
 Pawno on Rotten Tomatoes

References

Australian drama films